Hans (Johannes) Finohr (5 September 1891–8 November 1966) was a German actor.

Biography 
Finohr was born in the village of Rynnek, West Prussia, Imperial Germany and gained his first stage experiences at Heiligenbeil (Mamonovo). He worked at several theaters in  Königsberg, Gera, Vienna, Mannheim and Leipzig. From 1943 to 1957 he worked at the Staatsschauspiel Dresden.

Partial filmography

1952: Das verurteilte Dorf - Amerikanischer General
1953: Geheimakten Solvay - Lokführer
1954: Ernst Thälmann
1957: Schlösser und Katen - Der alte Sikora
1957: Wo du hingehst... - Mann
1958: Les Misérables - Un révolutionnaire #2
1958: Nur eine Frau
1958: Das Lied der Matrosen - Werftschreiber Schröder
1958: Tilman Riemenschneider - Bärtiger Bauer
1959: SAS 181 antwortet nicht
1959: An Old Love (1959) - Der alte Schwannaeke
1959: Intrigue and Love - Kammerdiener
1960: Always on Duty - Arthur Wedel
1960: Fünf Patronenhülsen - Pedro
1961: Ein Sommertag macht keine Liebe - Kaluweit
1962: Tanz am Sonnabend - Bruno Schönherr
1963: Praha nultá hodina - Siegfried Adler
1963: Sonntagsfahrer - Kontrolleur
1965: Tiefe Furchen - Pfarrer
1965: Solange Leben in mir ist - Ledebour
1965: Denk bloß nicht, ich heule - Bauer
1966: Die Söhne der Großen Bärin - Hawandschita
1968: Der Mord, der nie verjährt - Präsident (final film role)

References

1891 births
1966 deaths
German male stage actors
German male television actors
German male film actors
People from West Prussia
20th-century German male actors